Elachista chionella is a moth of the family Elachistidae that is endemic to Turkey.

Adults have silky white forewings.

References

chionella
Moths described in 1861
Endemic fauna of Turkey
Moths of Asia